Chisana (also Shushanna) (Tsetsaan' Na in Ahtna) is a  census-designated place (CDP) in the Copper River Census Area in the U.S. state of Alaska. As of the 2010 Census, the population of the CDP was 0. The English name Chisana derives from the Ahtna Athabascan name Tsetsaan' Na, meaning literally 'copper river' (not to be confused with the river known in English as the Copper River). The Chisana River joins the Nabesna River just north of Northway Junction, Alaska, to form the Tanana River, a major tributary of the Yukon River. The Chisana Airport consists of a turf and gravel runway which is largely serviced by flights from Tok, Alaska.

In 1985, the community was listed as Chisana Historic District on the National Register of Historic Places as a historic district.
In 1998 the Chisana Historic Mining Landscape historic district, comprising the community and a wide  area located partly in Copper River Census Area and partly in Southeast Fairbanks Census Area, was listed on the National Register of Historic Places.

Geography 
The total area is 0.10% water.

Climate

According to the Köppen Climate Classification system, Chisana has a subarctic climate, abbreviated "Dfc" on climate maps.

Demographics

Chisana first appeared on the 1920 U.S. Census as an unincorporated community. It appeared twice more in 1930 and 1940. It would not appear again until 2000, when it was made a census-designated place (CDP). However, in both 2000 and 2010, it reported no residents.

See also
National Register of Historic Places listings in Wrangell-St. Elias National Park and Preserve
National Register of Historic Places listings in Copper River Census Area, Alaska
National Register of Historic Places listings in Southeast Fairbanks Census Area, Alaska

References

Census-designated places in Alaska
Census-designated places in Copper River Census Area, Alaska
Census-designated places in Unorganized Borough, Alaska
Ghost towns in Alaska
Historic districts on the National Register of Historic Places in Alaska
Mining communities in Alaska
National Register of Historic Places in Wrangell–St. Elias National Park and Preserve
Ghost towns in the United States
Ghost towns in North America